Limey was a mid-1970s English pop/rock band. They released their only two albums, Limey and Silver Eagle in the UK on RCA Records. The band went through several lineups, and accounts of who was in the band at any given time are spotty and at times conflicting, but members included Brian Engel, Garth Watt-Roy, Ian Kewley and Dave Bowker.

Discography

Albums
1975: Limey
1977: Silver Eagle

Singles
1975: "Georgia Moon"
1976: "Both in Love with You"
1977: "Silver Eagle"

References

External links
 https://www.discogs.com/artist/2388367-Limey-3

British progressive rock groups
British soft rock music groups
RCA Records artists